By and By is a song by Charles Albert Tindley. It has been recorded by, among others, Golden Gate Quartet and Elvis Presley. Elvis Presley recorded it for the 1967 album How Great Thou Art.

Composed in 1905, it is a 3-versed hymn that pairs with the tune of the same name. It is also often
referred to by its first line, “We are often tossed and driven on the restless sea of time”, or the first line of the
refrain, “By and by, when the morning comes.”⁴ Like many of his songs, Tindley composed “We’ll
Understand it Better By and By” in his head, and transcribed and recorded it after, as Tindley was self-taught.

History
Tindley and his wife, Daisy Henry, attended Bainbridge St. Methodist Episcopal church together in
Philadelphia, Pennsylvania after the Civil War. Daisy was also a musician; like Tindley, she was a singer
and pianist. The pair had eight children together. Tindley began his involvement with his church as a janitor,
seeking religious tutelage from members of the church. He then began work at the church as an unpaid
sexton. Eventually, he became the pastor at the church, where he spoke of current events to his
congregation. He criticized the racism of the popular minstrel shows displayed throughout the country.
Through his leadership, the church grew in members and wealth. The church eventually had to relocate to a
bigger sanctuary in 1924 due to rapid growth. Tindley’s wife Daisy passed away on the day the
congregation moved to the larger sanctuary. He was reportedly heartbroken at her death, and later admitted
about her death that “one day I will understand it better by and by”.³ Several of the children Tindley had
with Daisy would help him publish his hymns and compositions.

Lyrics
"We are often tossed and driv’n on the restless sea of time, somber skies and howling tempest oft succeed a
bright sunshine; in that land of perfect day, when the mists have rolled away, we will understand it better by
and by.
Refrain: By and by, when the morning comes, when the saints of God are gathered home, we’ll tell the
story, how we’ve overcome, for we’ll understand it better by and by.
We are often destitute of the things that life demands, want of food and want of shelter, thirsty hills and
barren lands; we are trusting in the Lord, and according to the Word, we will understand it better by and by.

Temptations, hidden snares, often take us unawares, and our hearts are made to bleed for any thoughtless
word or deed; and we wonder why the test when we try to do our best, but we’ll understand it better by and
by." [Refrain]

Alternate Lyrics

"Trials dark on every hand, and we cannot understand all the ways of God would lead us to that blessed
promised land; but he guides us with his eye, and we'll follow till we die, for we'll understand it better by
and by. [Refrain]
Oft our cherished plans have failed, disappointments have prevailed, And we’ve wandered in the darkness,
heavy-hearted and alone But we’re trusting in the lord, and according to His word, We will understand it
better by and by. [Refrain]
Temptations, hidden snares, often take us unawares, and our hearts are made to bleed, for a thoughtless
word or deed; and we wonder why the test, when we try to do our best, but we'll understand it better by
and by."

Notable Performances

Noteworthy recordings and performances of the song have achieved high fame in American popular
culture. Elvis Presley included a rendition in his 1967 album How Great Thou Art, and the Golden Gate
Quartet recorded a version of the song in their album When the Saints Go Marching In.

See also
List of songs recorded by Elvis Presley

References

1. (1)http://delmarva-almanac.com/index.php/content/article/rev._charles_a._tindley/
2. (2)https://www.staugustine.com/story/lifestyle/faith/2018/03/23/story-behind-song-wellunderstand-it-better-by-and-by/12925669007/
3. (4)https://hymnary.org/text/we_are_often_tossed_and_driven_on_the
4. (5)http://collections.chadwyck.com.ccl.idm.oclc.org/bie/htxview?
template=basic.htx&content=frameset.htx

Elvis Presley songs
Year of song unknown
1900s songs